Gallman is an unincorporated community in Copiah County, Mississippi, United States. Gallman has a post office with ZIP code 39077, which opened on November 8, 1872.

Gallman is home to Copiah Academy, a private school in the Mississippi Association of Independent Schools. Copiah Academy services K3-12th grades and is a Christian-based college preparatory school.

History
Gallman is named for an early resident. Gallman is located on the former Illinois Central Railroad. In 1906 the population was estimated to be at 200 people, and the community was home to a church and several stores.

The Gallman Historic District was included in the National Register of Historic Places listings in Copiah County, Mississippi on March 31, 1986.

A post office operated under the name Wyoming from 1857 to 1858.

References

Unincorporated communities in Copiah County, Mississippi
Unincorporated communities in Mississippi